Ginger Prince (1942-2015) was a child actress, best known for her roles in a handful of Hallmark Productions pictures.  She starred in three of Kroger Babb's productions. She then returned to Atlanta, GA to host a radio program, "Ginger from Georgia".

Prince would later perform in Babb's 1950 narrative on alcoholism, One Too Many, with two musical numbers, and in the female beauty film The Secrets of Beauty with Hollywood makeup artist Ern Westmore.

She spent the rest of her childhood in Atlanta, dancing and experiencing a typical '50's girlhood before attending Stephens College in Missouri. However, the bright lights beckoned and she headed to New York to fulfill her dreams. She performed in summer stock at Casa Manana, and several other productions before returning to Atlanta and marrying, having two daughters, and becoming a choreographer for the Southern Ballet and later the Atlanta Ballet. She won a National Choreographer's Grant for her critically acclaimed modern ballet, "Lifeline". She also served on the Georgia Council for the Arts during Jimmy Carter's years as governor.

She returned to acting in earnest in the late 1970s. She appeared in many productions at the Golden Apple Dinner Theatre in Sarasota, Florida, and summer stock at The Brunswick Music Theatre in Brunswick, Maine. In the early 1980s, she returned to New York. In 1984, she landed a national tour of Pippin with Ben Vereen in the role of Fastrada. Then, the original cast of the Off Broadway Steel Magnolias on Christopher Street at the Lucille Lortel Theatre.

Ginger filled in time with other summer stock productions and sharing the love of her acting craft at Sande Shurin's acting studio. She taught some beginner courses in acting, and some courses at Marymount Manhattan College. From her early days with the Atlanta Ballet, she always thought of herself as a teacher.

In early 2007, Ginger moved to Prospect Park Residence, an assisted living facility, in Brooklyn, New York; she remained there for approximately two years before transferring to The Lillian Booth Actors Home of the Actors Fund in Englewood, New Jersey.

Roles
 The Prince of Peace (1948)
 One Too Many (1950)
 Secrets of Beauty (1951)
 "Lifeline" ballet 1975 and over 80 productions of musical and straight plays

References

External links
 

1942 births
2015 deaths
American child actresses
American stage actresses
20th-century American actresses
Actresses from Atlanta
21st-century American women